Salem Township, Indiana may refer to one of the following places:

 Salem Township, Delaware County, Indiana
 Salem Township, Pulaski County, Indiana
 Salem Township, Steuben County, Indiana

See also 

Salem Township (disambiguation)

Indiana township disambiguation pages